William Penn State Forest is a Pennsylvania State Forest in Pennsylvania Bureau of Forestry District #17.  The main offices are located in Elverson in Chester County, Pennsylvania in the United States.

The forest is named for William Penn, the founder of Pennsylvania. It was originally named "Valley Forge State Forest", for the camp at Valley Forge in the American Revolutionary War. Valley Forge State Park was the first state park in Pennsylvania, and the headquarters of the state forest were located there as well. The state park was transferred to the National Park Service and became a federal park in 1976 for the American Bicentennial. The state forest retained the Valley Forge name for thirty one years.

After the July 1, 2005, realignment of Pennsylvania State Forest Districts, what was then Valley Forge State Forest and District #17 acquired the northern parts of Berks and Lehigh Counties from Weiser State Forest and District #18. In August 2007, "In a bid to eliminate public confusion over the name of the federal park and the state forest district, the Bureau of Forestry renamed the Valley Forge State Forest District in honor of one of Pennsylvania's first conservationists -- William Penn."

Also included are the David R. Johnson Natural Area in Bucks County and the Gibraltar Hill and George W. Wertz Tracts in Berks County. District #17 also includes Berks, Bucks, Lehigh, Montgomery, Northampton, and Philadelphia counties.

History
William Penn State Forest was formed as a direct result of the depletion of the forests of Pennsylvania that took place during the mid-to-late 19th century. Conservationists like Dr. Joseph Rothrock became concerned that the forests would not regrow if they were not managed properly. Lumber and iron companies had harvested the old-growth forests for various reasons. They clear cut the forests and left behind nothing but dried tree tops and rotting stumps. The sparks of passing steam locomotives ignited wildfires that prevented the formation of second growth forests. The conservationists feared that the forest would never regrow if there was not a change in the philosophy of forest management. They called for the state to purchase land from the lumber and iron companies and the lumber and iron companies were more than willing to sell their land since that had depleted the natural resources of the forests. The changes began to take place in 1895 when Dr. Rothrock was appointed the first commissioner of the Pennsylvania Department of Forests and Waters, the forerunner of today's Pennsylvania Department of Conservation and Natural Resources. The Pennsylvania General Assembly passed a piece of legislation in 1897 that authorized the purchase of "unseated lands for forest reservations." This was the beginning of the State Forest system.

The first parcel of land that became William Penn State Forest was acquired in 1935 when the state bought  of land in Lancaster County from the heirs of the Cornwall Iron Furnace fortunes. The first  contained the Cornwall fire tower which was built in 1923. The second land acquisition did not take place until November 1982 when Little Tinicum Island in the Delaware River was purchased at a cost of $100,000. In December 1982 a second tract of land was purchased. Both Little Tinicum Island and the Goat Hill Serpentine Barrens are home to unique ecological habitats.

Neighboring state forest districts
The U.S. states of New Jersey, Delaware, and Maryland are to the east, south and southwest, respectively
Delaware State Forest (north)
Michaux State Forest (west)
Weiser State Forest (northwest)

Nearby state parks
Although no state parks are located within William Penn State Forest, there are fifteen state parks in District #17:
Delaware Canal State Park (Bucks and Northampton Counties)
Evansburg State Park (Montgomery County)
Fort Washington State Park (Montgomery County)
French Creek State Park (Berks County)
Marsh Creek State Park (Chester County)
Neshaminy State Park (Bucks County)
Nockamixon State Park (Bucks County)
Nolde Forest Environmental Education Center (Berks County)
Norristown Farm State Park (Montgomery County)
Ridley Creek State Park (Delaware County)
Benjamin Rush State Park (Philadelphia County)
Ralph Stover State Park (Bucks County)
Susquehannock State Park (Lancaster County)
Tyler State Park (Bucks County)
White Clay Creek Preserve (Chester County)

See also
Philadelphia Lazaretto

References

 
 Alt URL 
 Note: Map showing districts after the July 1, 2005 realignment
 Note: shows William Penn State Forest in West Nottingham Township.
 Note: shows William Penn State Forest in Tinicum Township.
 Note: shows William Penn State Forest in Penn Township as an unlabeled green area, north of Interstate 76 and on a road in Pennsylvania State Game Lands Number 156.

River islands of Pennsylvania
Valley Forge State Forest
State Forest
Protected areas established in 1935
Protected areas of Berks County, Pennsylvania
Protected areas of Carbon County, Pennsylvania
Protected areas of Dauphin County, Pennsylvania
Protected areas of Schuylkill County, Pennsylvania